Nahr Kemal (also Romanized as Nahr Kemāl; also known as Esfārch) is a village in Sarduiyeh Rural District, Sarduiyeh District, Jiroft County, Kerman Province, Iran. At the 2006 census, its population was 462, in 113 families.

References 

Populated places in Jiroft County